The 1997–98 Ottawa Senators season was the sixth season of the Ottawa Senators of the National Hockey League (NHL). The season saw the Senators face the challenge of improving on their very successful 1996–97 season, when they made the playoffs for the first time in team history. The 1997–98 season was even more successful, as Ottawa finished over .500 for the first time in club history, qualified for the playoffs for the second straight year, and won their first playoff series in modern club history. The Senators defeated the top-seeded New Jersey Devils in six games in the first round before falling to the Washington Capitals in five games in the second round.

Regular season
Alexei Yashin led the club offensively, with 72 points (33 goals, 39 assists) in 82 games. Damian Rhodes and Ron Tugnutt once again performed solidly in the Senators' net, helping set a club record for fewest goals allowed (200).

The Alexandre Daigle era came to an end midway through the season, as the Senators traded him to the Philadelphia Flyers in exchange for Václav Prospal and Pat Falloon.

Final standings

Playoffs
The Ottawa Senators ended the 1997–98 regular season as the Eastern Conference's eighth seed. Daniel Alfredsson, who missed 27 games in the regular season due to injuries, led the team with nine points (seven goals, two assists) in the playoffs and the club won its first round matchup, an upset win over the New Jersey Devils

Eastern Conference Quarterfinals: vs. (1) New Jersey Devils
On paper, the series was a big mismatch, as the Devils had finished 24 points ahead in the standings. One American newspaper covering the playoffs did not even preview the series, expecting an easy win for the Devils. The Devils were characterized as arrogant, although the Devils and the Senators had split their season series. Devil Randy McKay, when asked which player on the Senators he respected, said, "To be honest, I'd have to see their (roster) list."

The series opened in New Jersey. In Game 1, the Senators got a 1–0 lead and held onto it until 3:24 was left in the third period, when Doug Gilmour scored to tie the game. After the goal, the Devils got several penalties in a row, including some in overtime. Although the Senators went 0–6 on the power play, they managed to win the game on an overtime winner from Bruce Gardiner at 5:58. In Game 2, the Devils won the game in large part due to the offence of Doug Gilmour, who assisted on the first goal and scored the second, game-winning goal and an empty netter to tie the series.

The series now moved to Ottawa for Games 3 and 4. In Game 3, Damian Rhodes played outstanding and Alexei Yashin scored the winner, 2:47 into overtime on the power play. According to Devils' goaltender Martin Brodeur, "It's Rhodes, that's the bottom line. He has been tremendous. We're getting the puck to him, we're getting rebounds, but he closes the door every time." Devils Head Coach Jacques Lemaire refused to appear for the post-game press conference. The Senators won Game 4, 4–3, on the strength of a hat-trick by Daniel Alfredsson. The Senators had led 4–1, but late goals by Scott Stevens and Doug Gilmour, with 69 seconds left, made it a close contest.

The series now returned to New Jersey, with the Devils on the brink of elimination. In Game 5, Brodeur stopped 22 of 23 shots and even assisted on a short-handed goal as the Devils won 3–1. Gilmour scored the game-winner and the Devils staved off elimination.

In Game 6, Janne Laukkanen scored the winner, giving the Senators the lead that was solidified when Igor Kravchuk scored into an empty net to complete the series upset, 4–2, for the Senators. After the game, Scott Stevens commented, "The bottom line is that they're an average team that played great. And we're an above average team that played poorly." The headlines from other newspapers labelled the playoff win a "titanic upset" and "sensational upset."

Ottawa wins series 4–2.

Eastern Conference Semifinals: vs. (4) Washington Capitals
The Senators did not capitalize on their first-round win, and the Capitals took the series in five games.

Washington wins series 4–1

Awards and records
 Molson Cup - Alexei Yashin

Schedule and results

Player statistics

Regular season
Scoring

Goaltending

Playoffs
Scoring

Goaltending

Transactions

Trades

Waivers

Source:

Free agents

Draft picks
Ottawa's draft picks at the 1997 NHL Entry Draft in Pittsburgh, Pennsylvania.

Farm teams
 Worcester IceCats (American Hockey League)
 Raleigh IceCaps (East Coast Hockey League)

See also
1997–98 NHL season

References

 
 
The Internet Hockey Database
National Hockey League Guide & Record Book 2007

Ottawa Senators seasons
Ottawa Senators season, 1997-98
Ottawa